The Municipal Commission of Singapore was a body created in 1887 by the British colonial government to replace the Municipal Committee that was created in June 1848. 

The role of the commission was to manage key services for the Town of Singapore, such as utilities, water services and urban planning. 

The body had commission board members internally elected but ceased from 1913 until 1949, after which it acted like a quasi-municipal government until the City Council of Singapore was created in 1951.

Background
The commission elections took place in 1949 and 1950 with six divisions:

 City
 East
 North
 Rochore
 South
 West

References

History of Singapore
Singapore